Sun Tiantian and Nenad Zimonjić were the defending champions, but Sun chose not to participate. Zimonjić partnered with Anna-Lena Grönefeld, but lost in the first round to Cara Black and Leander Paes.

Sania Mirza and Mahesh Bhupathi won the title, defeating Nathalie Dechy and Andy Ram in the final 6–3, 6–1.

Seeds

Draw

Finals

Top half

Bottom half

External links
 2009 Australian Open – Doubles draws and results at the International Tennis Federation

Mixed Doubles
Australian Open (tennis) by year – Mixed doubles